Broadus Edwards House, also known as the Paul Garber House, is a historic home located at Batesburg-Leesville, Lexington County, South Carolina. It was built in 1905, and is a -story, Queen Anne style weatherboard residence set on a brick foundation.  It has a two-story turret under a tent roof and a bay surmounted by a pedimented cross gable.  The house was built by Broadus Edwards, prominent Batesburg merchant, mortician, and town councilman.

It was listed on the National Register of Historic Places in 1982.

References

Houses on the National Register of Historic Places in South Carolina
Queen Anne architecture in South Carolina
Houses completed in 1905
Houses in Lexington County, South Carolina
National Register of Historic Places in Lexington County, South Carolina
1905 establishments in South Carolina